The Drift Prairie is a geographic region of North Dakota and South Dakota.

In North Dakota, the Drift Prairie is the transition zone between two zones.
The gently rolling hills and shallow lakes were formed by glacial action,  while the Badlands to the west are characterized by the lack of this action, and the Red River Valley to the east was a lake bed.  This distinction causes the area considered as Drift Prairie to overlap somewhat with the Missouri Plateau, another of North Dakota's distinct geographic regions, but the Drift Prairie also includes the Souris River basin. Prairie grasses and wheat grow there making it a perfect place for ranchers. The prairie is filled with drift. Drift is soil consisting of clay, sand, and gravel.

In South Dakota, most of the eastern state is covered by the Drift Prairie. The Missouri River cuts through the center of the state. To the east of the river are low hills and lakes formed by glaciers  referred to as the Drift Prairie. The area is bordered on the east by the Minnesota River Valley and on the west by the James River Basin.

See also
Geography of North Dakota
Geography of South Dakota

References

Regions of North Dakota
Regions of South Dakota
Prairies
Landforms of North Dakota
Landforms of South Dakota